Foudre may refer to
any of various French ships named Foudre
Foudre Sportive d'Akonolinga, a Cameroonian football club